"999" is a song recorded by American singer Selena Gomez and Colombian singer Camilo. It was released through Interscope Records on August 27, 2021. The song was written by Gomez, Camilo, and Edgar Barrera and is produced by Camilo and Barrera.

Release
The song was first teased on Twitter with Gomez teasing the song tweeting "1000 yo sé que piensas en mí y el corazón se te mueve…si tú quieres ir a 1000...". Camilo quote tweeted her tweet saying "999... yo estoy en 999!", further confirming the collaboration. They tweeted a pre-save link shortly after. The song was released on August 27, 2021.

Composition
The song described as a dreamy and rhythmic-pop song with ballad at its arrangement. Where it composed in the key of C# Major, with a fast tempo of 150 beats per minute and runs for three minutes and 44 seconds. Lyrically, its "about the beauty of true love."

Music video
The official music video for "999" was released on the same day as the song on August 27, 2021. It was directed by Sophie Muller.

Credits and personnel 
Credits adopted from Tidal.
 Selena Gomez — vocals, lyricist, composer
 Camilo — vocals, lyricist, composer, producer
 Edgar Barrera — vocal, lyricist, composer, producer
 A.C. — producer, guitar, programmer 
 Vnsa — mix engineer
 Mick Raskin — mix engineer 
 Kat Dahlia — background vocals
 John Hanes — engineer, mix engineer
 Nicholas Ramirez — engineer
 Natalia Ramirez — engineer, vocal producer
 Bart Schoudel — engineer, vocal producer 
 Chris Gehringer — mastering engineer
 Serban Ghenea — mixer
 Sam Riback — production coordinator
 Aleen Keshishian — production coordinator
 John Janick — production coordinator
 Nir Seroussi — production coordinator
 Zack Morgenroth — production coordinator
 Benjamin Tischker — production coordinator
 Vanessa Angiuli — production coordinator

Charts

Year-end charts

Release history

References

2021 songs
2021 singles
Selena Gomez songs
Camilo (singer) songs
Songs written by Selena Gomez
Songs written by Edgar Barrera
Spanish-language songs
Music videos directed by Sophie Muller
Songs written by Camilo (singer)